Anand Yalvigi (born 9 February 1975) is a former Indian cricketer. He played as a right-hand batsman and right-arm off break bowler. He made his debut in First-class cricket on 4 November 1996 in a Ranji Trophy match for Mumbai against Saurashtra. Overall he has played 29 First-class cricket matches and 14 List A matches.

References

1975 births
Living people
Indian cricketers
Karnataka cricketers
Mumbai cricketers
Maharashtra cricketers
Cricketers from Pune